Dual format is a technique used to allow software for two systems which would normally require different disk formats to be recorded on the same floppy disk.

In the late 1980s, the term was used to refer to disks that could be used to boot either an Amiga or Atari ST computer. The layout of the first track of the disk was specially laid out to contain an Amiga and an Atari ST boot sector at the same time by fooling the operating system to think that the track resolved into the format it expected. The technique was used for some commercially available games, and also for the disks covermounted on ST/Amiga Format magazine. Other games came on Amiga and PC dual-format disks, or even "tri-format" disks, which contained the Amiga, Atari ST and PC versions of the game.

Most dual and tri-format disks were implemented using technology developed by Rob  Computing.

Later, the term was used for disks containing both Windows and Macintosh versions.

Examples 

Action Fighter (Amiga/PC dual-format disk)
Lethal Xcess - Wings of Death II (Amiga/Atari ST dual-format disks)
Monster Business (Amiga/Atari ST dual-format disk)
Populous: The Promised Lands (Amiga/Atari ST dual-format disk)
Rick Dangerous (Amiga/PC dual-format disk)
Rick Dangerous 2 (Amiga/PC dual-format disk)
Stone Age (Amiga/Atari ST dual-format disk)
Street Fighter (Amiga/PC dual-format disk)
StarGlider 2 (Amiga/Atari ST dual-format disk)
3D Pool (Amiga/Atari ST/PC tri-format disk)
Stunt Car Racer (Amiga/PC dual-format disk)
Bionic Commando (Amiga/PC dual-format disk)
Carrier Command (Amiga/PC dual-format disk)
Blasteroids (Amiga//PC dual-format disk)
E-Motion (Amiga//PC dual-format disk)
Indiana Jones and the Last Crusade Action (Amiga//PC dual-format disk)
Out Run (Amiga/PC dual-format disk)
World Class Leader Board (Amiga/PC dual-format disk)
International Soccer Challenge (Amiga/PC dual-format disk)
MicroProse Soccer (Amiga/PC dual-format disk)

See also

References

Amiga
Atari ST
IBM PC compatibles
Macintosh platform
Rotating disc computer storage media
Software distribution
Video game distribution